Claude Gauthier is a Canadian former ice hockey player who played right wing and was drafted first overall in the 1964 NHL Amateur Draft by the Detroit Red Wings. He never played in the National Hockey League.

References

External links

Possibly living people
Year of birth missing
Detroit Red Wings draft picks
National Hockey League first-overall draft picks
National Hockey League first-round draft picks
Canadian ice hockey right wingers